This article describes the qualifying for the 2012–13 EHF Champions League.

Qualification tournament
A total of 14 teams took part in the qualification tournaments. The clubs were drawn into three groups of four and played a semifinal and the final. The winner of the qualification groups advanced to the group stage, while the eliminated clubs went to the EHF Cup. Matches were played at 8–9 September 2011. The draw took place on July 3, at 11:00 local time at Vienna, Austria.

Seedings
The two remaining teams from Pot 1 and 4 played a knock-out match, the winner went into the group stage. The draw was held on July 3, 2012.

Qualification tournament 1
RK Partizan organized the event.

Semifinals

Third place game

Final

Qualification tournament 2
Haslum HK organized the event.

Semifinals

Third place game

Final

Qualification tournament 3
HCM Constanța organized the event.

Semifinals

Third place game

Final

Play-off
HC Dinamo-Minsk and Beşiktaş J.K. played a playoff series to determine a participant for the group stage.

Dinamo-Minsk wins 61–46 on aggregate.

Wild card tournament
Saint-Raphaël Var HB was awarded the right to organize the tournament.

 Note 1: RK Cimos Koper was invited to the Wild card tournament to replace Bjerringbro-Silkeborg, who replaced AG København in the group stage.

Semifinals

Third place game

Final

References

External links
 Official website

2012–13 EHF Champions League